Sir William Powell's Almshouses are 12 Grade II* listed almshouses at Church Gate, Fulham, London.

They are managed by the Sir Oswald Stoll Foundation.

References

Grade II* listed houses in London
Grade II* listed almshouses
Houses in the London Borough of Hammersmith and Fulham
Almshouses in London
Grade II* listed buildings in the London Borough of Hammersmith and Fulham